" Five " is the second single by the Japanese singer Meisa Kuroki. The single was released in Japan on June 2, 2010 in two editions: CD+DVD and CD only and later added in Meisa's first album Magazine. It ranked #16 on the Oricon Daily Singles Сhart and #23 on the Oricon Weekly Singles Сhart with 4,188 copies sold in first week.

Track list

Charts

Sales and certifications

Sources

2010 singles
Japanese-language songs
Meisa Kuroki songs
Songs written by Jeff Miyahara
2010 songs